Apocynaceae (from Apocynum, Greek for "dog-away") is a family of flowering plants that includes trees, shrubs, herbs, stem succulents, and vines, commonly known as the dogbane family, because some taxa were used as dog poison  Members of the family are native to the European, Asian, African, Australian, and American tropics or subtropics, with some temperate members. The former family Asclepiadaceae (now known as Asclepiadoideae) is considered a subfamily of Apocynaceae and contains 348 genera. A list of Apocynaceae genera may be found here.

Many species are tall trees found in tropical forests, but some grow in tropical dry (xeric) environments. Also perennial herbs from temperate zones occur. Many of these plants have milky latex, and many species are poisonous if ingested, the family being rich in genera containing alkaloids and cardiac glycosides, those containing the latter often finding use as arrow poisons.  Some genera of Apocynaceae, such as Adenium, bleed clear sap without latex when damaged, and others, such as Pachypodium, have milky latex apart from their sap.

Taxonomy

As of 2012, the family was described as comprising some 5,100 species, in five subfamilies: 
 Apocynoideae Burnett, 1835
 Asclepiadoideae Burnett, 1835 (incorporating the Asclepiadaceae)
 Periplocoideae Endl., 1838
 Rauvolfioideae Kostel., 1834
 Secamonoideae Endl., 1838

The former family Asclepiadaceae is included in Apocynaceae according to the Angiosperm Phylogeny Group III  (APG III) modern, largely molecular-based system of flowering plant taxonomy. 
An updated classification, including 366 genera, 25 tribes and 49 subtribes, was published in 2014.

Distribution and habitat

Species in this family are distributed mainly in tropical regions: 
In northern Australia: small evergreen trees such as Alstonia, Alyxia, Cerbera and Ochrosia
In deciduous forests of Africa, India and Indo-China: smaller trees such as Carissa, Wrightia and Holarrhena
In tropical America, India, Myanmar and Malaya: evergreen trees and shrubs, such as Rauvolfia, Tabernaemontana and Acokanthera
In Central America: Plumeria, or the frangipani, with its waxy white or pink flowers and a sweet scent
In South America, Africa and Madagascar: many lianas, such as Landolphia
In the Mediterranean region: Nerium, with the well-known oleander or be-still tree (Nerium oleander)
The only genera found in temperate Europe away from the Mediterranean are Vinca (Apocynoideae) and Vincetoxicum (Asclepiadoideae). Also Asclepias syriaca is an invasive weed (e. g., in many areas of Ukraine).
In North America: Apocynum, dogbane or Indian hemp, including Apocynum cannabinum, a traditional source of fiber. Also the bluestars, Amsonia, herbaceous perennials of upright habit, grown as ornamental plants for their attractive flowers.
In continental southern Africa (Angola, Botswana, Eswatini, Mozambique, South Africa, and Zimbabwe) and Madagascar, except for the humid evergreen forest of the eastern side of Madagascar, and never above  for the entire island: Pachypodium and Fockea

Description

Growth pattern
The dogbane/milkweed family includes annual plants, perennial herbs, stem succulents, woody shrubs, trees, or vines. Most exude a milky latex when cut.

Leaves and stems
Leaves are simple. They may appear one at a time (singly) with each occurrence on alternating sides of the stem (alternate), but usually occur in pairs (and rarely in whorls). When paired, they occur on opposite sides of the stem (opposite), with each pair occurring at an angle rotated 90° to the pair below it (decussate).

There is no stipule (a small leaf-like structure at the base of the leaf stem), or stipules are small and sometimes fingerlike.

Inflorescence and fruit

They are perfect (bisexual), with a synsepalous, five-lobed calyx united into a tube at the base. Inflorescences are terminal or axillary. Five petals are united into a tube with four or five epipetalous stamens. The style head is swollen. The pollen is transported in foam. The ovary is usually superior, bicarpellary, and apocarpous, with a common fused style and stigma. (Fig. 5. and Fig.6. in the illustration of Rhigospira quadrangularis show  a typical tripartite style which divides into three zones (specialised for pollen deposition, viscin secretion, and the reception of pollen)

The fruit is a drupe, a berry, a capsule, or a (frequently paired) follicle. The seeds are  often winged or have appendages of long silky hairs.

Ecology
Several genera are preferred larval host plants for the Queen Butterfly (Danaus gilippus).

Toxicity
Many species of plants from the family Apocynaceae have some toxicity, with some being extremely poisonous if parts are ingested, or if they are not handled properly. Genera containing cardiac glycosides—  Cerbera, Nerium, Asclepias, Cascabela, Strophanthus, Acokanthera, Apocynum, Thevetia, etc.—have therapeutic ranges, but are often associated with accidental poisonings, in many cases lethal (see below). Alkaloid-producing species like Rauvolfia serpentina, Catharanthus roseus, and Tabernanthe iboga are likewise the source of compounds with  therapeutic ranges, but which have significant associated toxicities if not taken in appropriate doses and in controlled fashion. (See below)

Uses
Several members of the family Apocynaceae have had economic uses in the past. Several are sources of important natural products—pharmacologic tool compounds and drug research candidates, and in some cases actual prescription drugs. Cardiac glycosides, which affect heart function, are a ready example.  Genera studied and known to contain such glycosides include Acokanthera, Apocynum, Cerbera, Nerium, Thevetia and Strophanthus. Rauvolfia serpentina (Indian snakeroot) contains the alkaloid reserpine, which has been used as an antihypertensive and an antipsychotic drug but its adverse effects limit its clinical use. Catharanthus roseus yields alkaloids used in the treatment of cancer.  Tabernanthe iboga, Voacanga africana, and Tabernaemontana undulata contain the alkaloid ibogaine, which is a psychedelic drug which may help with drug addiction, but which has significant adverse effects,  with ibogaine being both cardiotoxic and neurotoxic. Ajmalicine, an alkaloid found in Rauvolfia spp., Catharanthus roseus, and Mitragyna speciosa,   is an antihypertensive drug used in the treatment of high blood pressure.

Many genera are grown as ornamental plants, including Amsonia (bluestar), Nerium (oleander), Vinca (periwinkle), Carissa (Natal plum), Allamanda (golden trumpet), Plumeria (frangipani), Thevetia, Mandevilla (Savannah flower), and Adenium (desert-rose).

In addition, the genera Landolphia, Carpodinus, and Mascarenhasia have been used as commercial sources of inferior rubber. (See Congo rubber).

There are limited dietary uses of plants from this family. The flower of Fernaldia pandurata is edible. Carissa (Natal plum) produces an edible fruit, but all other parts of the plant are poisonous. The genus Apocynum was reportedly used as a source of fiber by Native Americans. The aromatic fruit juice from Saba comorensis (syn. Landolphia comorensis, the Bungo or Mbungo fruit) is used as a drink.

Finally, ethnopharmacologic and ethnotoxicologic uses are also known. The roots of Tabernanthe iboga and certain Voacanga species have traditionally  been used ceremonially as hallucinogens in Africa.  The ibogaine-type alkaloids responsible for the psychoactivity of these plants have been studied with regard to the treatment of  drug addiction. The juice of Acokanthera species such as A. venenata and the milky juice of the Namibian Pachypodium have been used as poison for arrow tips.

Many species are ornamental in gardens or as houseplants.

Gallery

Flowers

Fruits

Pachycaul species

References

External links
 Apocynaceae in BoDD – Botanical Dermatology Database

Further reading
 A review on antimicrobial botanicals, phytochemicals and natural resistance modifying agents from Apocynaceae family: Possible therapeutic approaches against multidrug resistance in pathogenic microorganisms. 

 
Asterid families

ms:Apocynaceae